Thoma Mar Dionysius established Mount Tabor Monastery, also known as Mount Tabor Ashram, in the city of Pathanapuram in 1929. The main objectives were promotion of monastic life, starting of educational institutions, opening of Bhavan for the old and children and hospitals, social service and teaching of Orthodox beliefs. There are 47 members in the ashram.

Thoma Mar Dionysius (1929–1972) was the first Superior, since 1972 Catholicate - designate Thomas Mar Timotheos (now Catholicos ) is the superior. Ramban Zacharia (1964–79), Ramban C.T. Isac (1979–80), Ramban T.M. Samuel (1980–92) have served as secretaries. Since 1992 Fr.K.A. Abraham is the secretary.

The Ashram has branches at Pattazhi Maduraimalai, Melam Kulamudie. Kurienayam, Malloor, Podukal- Ramankuth, Mananthavadi- Thondarnadu, Thiruchirapalli Malankara (Tamil Nadu) and Puthenkodu Mathoor (Tamil Nadu).

There is a Boys' Home in Melam Kulanudi and a 100-bed hospital in Mathur, Tamil Nadu, in operation under the Mount Tabor Ashram. Two colleges, one higher secondary school, six high schools, six lower- upper primary schools are run under the supervision of the Ashram.

Christian organizations established in 1929
Churches in Kollam district
Malankara Orthodox Syrian church buildings